Stockton is a railway station on the Durham Coast Line, which runs between Newcastle and Middlesbrough via Hartlepool. It is owned by Network Rail and managed by Northern Trains.

Thornaby railway station (known as "South Stockton" until 1892), across the River Tees from Stockton-on-Tees provides a wider range of services and acts as the main railway station for most of Stockton-on-Tees. This station originally had a roof but it was removed in 1979 due to being in a bad state of repair and it has not been replaced since (the same work also saw the removal of redundant track & platforms).  The other main buildings are also no longer in rail use, having been converted into apartments.

Station facilities here have been improved and included new fully lit waiting shelters, digital information screens and the installation of CCTV. The long-line Public Address system (PA) has been renewed and upgraded with pre-recorded train announcements. A fully accessible footbridge has also been built to provide step-free access to both platforms.  There are however no ticket facilities here (the station being unmanned), so all tickets have to be bought prior to travel or on the train.

Grand Central services between Sunderland and London King's Cross pass through the station but do not stop here.

History
One of the intermediate stations on the line was at Stockton-on-Tees, this station opening on 2 June 1852; it was very soon renamed, becoming North Stockton in either 1852 or 1853. 
At that time, it was shared by the LNR and the Stockton and Hartlepool Railway. but soon after, in 1854, they both amalgamated with several other railways to form the North Eastern Railway (NER). On 1 November 1892 this station resumed its original name, and this was retained until 1985 when British Rail simplified the name to Stockton. The 1852 station was rebuilt on the same site in 1892/3 by the NER, including the overall roof  mentioned above. 

The current station is not at the same location as the former terminus of the Stockton and Darlington Railway (though using the same name).

These routes were built primarily to convey coal from the many collieries in the area to the docks at Middlesbrough, but the Ferryhill and Wellfield lines also had local passenger services that called here. Trains on the Wellfield route were withdrawn by the LNER in November 1931, whilst the Ferryhill service ended in March 1952.

Services

There is an hourly service from the station in each direction (with a few peak hour extras), northbound to Sunderland and Newcastle and southbound to Middlesbrough.  Many northbound trains continue to Hexham, whilst most southbound trains run through to Nunthorpe (some continue beyond there, including two through trains to ).

These are the last remnants of the much more frequent direct service (approx two-hourly Mon-Sat plus some Sunday trains) that ran between Darlington and Hartlepool up until 1991.

References

Sources

External links
 
 

Railway stations in the Borough of Stockton-on-Tees
DfT Category F1 stations
Former North Eastern Railway (UK) stations
Railway stations in Great Britain opened in 1852
Northern franchise railway stations
William Bell railway stations
1852 establishments in England
Buildings and structures in Stockton-on-Tees